The discography of the American hardcore punk band Amen consists of four studio albums, two compilation albums, two live albums, two music videos, four singles and one video album.

Albums

Studio albums

Compilations

Live albums

Singles

Video albums

Music videos

References 

Discographies of American artists